Tang Li (Chinese: 唐莉; Pinyin: Táng Lì; born July 27, 1982) is a Chinese professional Go player.

Biography 
Tang started learning Go when most kids in China did, at the young age of 6. She became a professional at the age of 16, in 1998. In that same year she won 2nd place at the National Youth Women tournament, along with 2nd place at the National Sports Meeting tournament.

References 

1982 births
Living people
Chinese Go players
Female Go players
Sportspeople from Chongqing